Ancylosis xylinella is a species of snout moth in the genus Ancylosis. It was described by Staudinger, in 1870. It is found in Spain, Russia, Kazakhstan and Turkey.

References

External links
lepiforum.de

Moths described in 1870
xylinella
Moths of Europe
Moths of Asia